Inverted cone filtration (ICF) is a process used to remove particulate and dissolved contaminants from a designated fluid such as water. 

In a typical design, fluid enters the narrow top end of the filter falling onto a chamber where pressure head is built to force the fluid across woven filter media. The pressure differential on the inner and outer wall of the filter is caused by a low pressure outlet pipe that carries out the treated fluid.

Practical application 

Inverted cone filtration has been successfully used in stormwater quality application. The filter is made with monofilament polypropylene that as serves as a barrier to solid and dissolved particulate matter.

Filtration